Loznica is a city located in the Mačva District of western Serbia. It lies on the right bank of the Drina river. In 2011 the city had a total population of 19,572, while the administrative area had a population of 79,327.

Its name stems from the word "loza" (the Serbian word for vine). Originally, its name was Lozica (Serbian for small vine), but it later became Loznica.

History

The oldest settlements on the territory of Jadar and Loznica can be traced to the Neolithic period when the Starčevo culture flourished from 4500–3000 BC. Illyrian and Celtic tribes inhabited the region prior to the Roman conquest in 75 BC. Roman conquest of the Balkan peninsula brought huge changes: the territory became part of the Roman province of Dalmatia.

The most important settlement in Jadar was Genzis, located near Lešnica, while the Roman settlement in present-day Loznica was called Ad Drinum. Legend tells that Loznica was named after the grape vines that were grown in this region, starting from the 3rd century BC in the time of Roman Emperor Probus. The first reference to the town as Loznica dates back to the reign of Serbian King Stefan Milutin, when Catherine, the wife of Milutin's brother Dragutin, founded the nearby monastery of Tronoša (1317). Loznica received little notice for the next two hundred years. By 1533, Loznica had been conquered from the Serbian Despotate by the Ottoman Empire and was then populated by Muslims; according to the tax registry, out of 37 houses, 26 houses were Muslim and 11 were Christian.

In 1600, Loznica became an officially Muslim (Bosniak) settlement with 55 houses. In this period Loznica and Jadar were part of the region administered from Zvornik. The Zvornik region itself was ruled by the pasha in Bosnia. Striving toward liberation from Ottoman rule, the population of Loznica was actively involved in the common fight of the Serbian people, beginning with the First Serbian Uprising of 1804. The uprising was very important since the Ottomans did not easily give up on the border part of their territory from which they could harvest taxes and supply their army as well as break through towards the central part of the rebellious Serbia.

During the whole period of the First Uprising (1804–13), numerous and heavy battles against the Ottomans were fought in Loznica and its vicinity. In 1813 the Serbs managed to drive the Ottomans across the river Drina, at which time the Ottomans reoccupied Loznica. In November 1833, Loznica and Jadar officially became part of the Principality of Serbia, during the rule of Miloš Obrenović, when Sultan Mahmud II ceded six seized regions to Serbia. This resulted in the abolition of Ottoman ownership over the land and it was declared a free peasant state, which meant that the feudal system was revoked.

Jadar became part of the Podrinje region, while Loznica became the seat of the region, remaining in this role until the end of the 19th century, when the capital was moved to Šabac. During the thirties of the 19th century, Loznica had 295 houses with 1203 people and became the centre of the administrative and political power of Podrinje. The education system started to develop and a hospital was set up (1882), construction of industrial buildings started, craftsmen, trade and banking started to develop. Construction of the railway between Šabac, Loznica and Banja Koviljaca started by the beginning of the 20th century. The First Balkan War and First World War halted economic development and significantly reduced the number of people in Loznica and vicinity.

Upon completion of the First World War, Loznica remained a regional centre with about 5000 people. There was a short period of reconstruction and economic development, followed by the Great Depression, which saw a decline in the prices of agricultural products. By the mid-1930s, craft and trade shops had been established, bringing some relief to the economy. Later, the antimony mines were acquired by German industrialists which further strengthened the economy. This growth was, however, brought to an abrupt halt at the beginning of World War II. Loznica became the first city in Europe to be liberated from German occupation when Chetnik units entered on 31 August 1941.

In January 2008, according to the Serbian law, Loznica received the status of a city.

Geography and climate
The city is located in western Serbia, in the Mačva District, near the border with Bosnia and Herzegovina. It lies on the right bank of the Drina river.

Climate
Loznica has a humid subtropical climate with cold winters, often very cold due to the mountain winds of nearby mountains, and warm to hot summers. When hot air from Adriatic Sea starts going inland, to the north-east it rises over mountain barriers (Zlatar and Zlatibor), gaining jet effect and continuing fast to western parts of Serbia.

Demographics

According to the 2011 census, the ethnic groups in the city of Loznica include Serbs (79,327), and smaller numbers of Romani (761), ethnic Muslims (660), Yugoslavs (74), Montenegrins (58) and others.

Settlements
Aside from Loznica, the city includes the following settlements:

Banja Koviljača
Baščeluci
Bradić
Brezjak
Brnjac
Veliko Selo
Voćnjak
Gornja Badanja
Gornja Borina
Gornja Koviljača
Gornja Sipulja
Gornje Nedeljice
Gornji Dobrić
Grnčara
Donja Badanja
Donja Sipulja
Donje Nedeljice
Donji Dobrić
Draginac
Zajača
Jadranska Lešnica
Jarebice
Jelav
Joševa
Jugovići
Kamenica
Klupci
Kozjak
Korenita
Krajišnici
Lešnica
Lipnica
Lipnički Šor
Lozničko Polje
Milina
Meraja
Novo Selo
Paskovac
Ploča
Pomijača
Ribarice
Runjani
Simino Brdo
Slatina
Straža
Stupnica
Tekeriš
Trbosilje
Trbušnica
Tršić
Filipovići
Cikote
Čokešina
Šurice

Society and culture

Culture

Among cultural heritage include the Church of the Holy Virgin located in the town, the 14th-century Čokešina Monastery, the 13th-century Tronoša Monastery, and monuments on Mount Gučevo, in Tekeriš, and in Draginac, as well as the ethnic village of Tršić.

A Serbian epic poem is the Battle of Loznica in which the central figure Anta Bogičević leads Serbian forces during the First Serbian Uprising. The most important local cultural event is "Vukov Sabor" (Council of Vuk) in Tršić, held annually in September, in memory of Vuk Stefanović Karadžić who was born in the village; it remains the oldest and largest cultural event in Serbia, for its importance and the increasing volume (20-30,000 visitors).

Sport
Loznica's local football club is called FK Loznica, with the Lagator Stadium as home ground.

Economy

The largest factory of Loznica was "HI Viskoza Loznica", founded in 1957 with over 10,000 employees (1981), at the time when the city had 18,000 inhabitants. Production of trailers was primarily in the factory "FAK Loznica", and textile production in "Moda" Loznica.

Italian manufacturer of stockings and women's underwear "Golden Lady" has a factory in Loznica, exporting to countries of the European Union. For now the factory employs 550 workers.

Also, one of the largest lithium deposits (Jadar mine) in Serbia with total reserves of 125.3 million tonnes is located in Loznica.

The following table gives a preview of total number of registered people employed in legal entities per their core activity (as of 2018):

Gallery

Twin cities
  Płock, Poland
  Ivanić-Grad, Croatia

Notable people
Jovan Cvijić, geographer, president of the Serbian Royal Academy of Sciences and rector of the University of Belgrade
Vuk Stefanović Karadžić, linguist, born in Tršić, educated in Tronoša
Saša Janković, Ombudsman of Serbia
Dragan Kojić Keba, singer
Sinan Sakić, singer
Momčilo Spremić, historian
Zlatko Junuzović, Austrian football player
Aleksandra Crvendakić, basketball player, Olympic bronze medalist
Branko Lazić, basketball player, EuroBasket silver medalist
Aleksandar Gligoric, actor
Dragan Mićanović, Serbian actor
Milinko Pantić, Serbian football player and coach.

See also
 List of places in Serbia

References

External links

 City of Loznica
 Internet portal Loznica

 
Populated places in Mačva District
Municipalities and cities of Šumadija and Western Serbia
Starčevo–Körös–Criș culture